Norwood Hills Country Club, formerly known as North Hills Country Club, is a country club located in Jennings, Missouri.  Norwood Hills Country Club has a rich tradition and history dating back to the 1920s, when Norwood found its beginning as North Hills Country Club. It has an excellent youth golf program, and is the home course to Lutheran High School North. Norwood is very youth oriented and friendly. It is also known for its high value to cost ratio compared to other area country clubs. The club has hosted many prestigious events including the National Left-Handed Golfer's Championship in 1936 and 1940, the PGA Championship in 1948 won by Ben Hogan, the LPGA Tour's St. Louis Women's Invitational from 1965 to 1969, the PGA Tour's Greater St. Louis Golf Classic in 1972 and 1973, the U.S. Senior Amateur in 2001, and the U.S. Women's Mid-Amateur in 2018, and the Ascension Charity Classic in 2021.

It was listed on the National Register of Historic Places in 2005.

References

External links
Official site

Buildings and structures completed in 1922
Golf clubs and courses in Missouri
Buildings and structures in St. Louis County, Missouri
Clubhouses on the National Register of Historic Places in Missouri
Historic districts on the National Register of Historic Places in Missouri
National Register of Historic Places in St. Louis County, Missouri
Event venues on the National Register of Historic Places in Missouri
Golf clubs and courses on the National Register of Historic Places
1922 establishments in Missouri
Sports venues on the National Register of Historic Places in Missouri